WAWD (channel 58), branded as Beach TV, is an independent television station in Fort Walton Beach, Florida, providing advertising and infomercials targeting the visitors of Fort Walton Beach and Pensacola. The transmitter is located near SR 87, north of Navarre, Florida.

The station is owned by Beach TV Properties, which also owns several tourist stations across the southeastern US.

Digital channel

References

External links

RECNET information on WAWD (contains detailed information from the FCC

Television channels and stations established in 1998
Independent television stations in the United States
AWD
1998 establishments in Florida